The Maghreb–Europe Gas Pipeline (MEG; also known as the Pere Duran Farell pipeline or Gazoduc Maghreb Europe  GME) is a natural gas pipeline, which links the Hassi R'Mel gas field in Algeria through Morocco with Cordoba in Andalusia, Spain, where it is connected with the Spanish and Portuguese gas grids. Before the operation of the pipeline ceased in October 2021, it used to supply mainly Spain and Portugal, as well as Morocco with natural gas.

History
The Maghreb–Europe Gas Pipeline was first proposed in 1963 by French companies. This proposal foresaw prolongation of the pipeline to Strasbourg in France.  However, because of the Western Sahara dispute, any route from Algeria through Morocco to Spain was prevented. Also natural gas consumption in Spain was too low to justify the pipeline construction.

The project started in early 1990s.  In 1992, ministers of Spain and Algeria agreed to start the construction of the pipeline.  At the same time Sonatrach and Enagás signed a long-term supply agreement. It followed by signing the Moroccan Convention establishing the procedures for the construction, operation and use of the pipeline. At the same year, the project company Europe - Maghreb Pipeline Ltd. was established.  In 1994, Transgas of Portugal) joined the project.  Construction started on 11 October 1994.

The pipeline came on stream on 1 November 1996 and it was commissioned on 9 November 1996.  The Spanish section was inaugurated in Cordoba on 9 December 1996.  The Portuguese section was inaugurated on 27 February 1997.  In 2000, the pipeline was named after Pedro or Pere Duran Farell.

Following the breakdown of diplomatic relations between Algeria and Morocco in August 2021, Algeria decided not to renew the 25-year MGE operation contract, which expired at midnight on 31 October 2021, opting instead to supply Spain through the Medgaz pipeline.

Technical description
It was built by Bechtel and Saipem. The pipeline consists of five sections.

An initial capacity of the pipeline was 8.6 billion cubic meters (bcm) of natural gas per year, which was later expanded to 12 bcm.

Route and operators
It is owned and operated by the Algerian national state-owned oil company, Sonatrach.

See also

 Medgaz
 Trans-Mediterranean Pipeline
 Greenstream pipeline
 GALSI
 Trans-Saharan gas pipeline

References

Energy infrastructure completed in 1996
Natural gas pipelines in Algeria
Natural gas pipelines in Spain
Natural gas pipelines in Morocco
Natural gas pipelines in Portugal
Algeria–Morocco relations
Algeria–Spain relations
Morocco–Spain relations
Morocco–Portugal relations
Portugal–Spain relations
Pipelines under the Mediterranean Sea
1996 establishments in Algeria
1996 establishments in Morocco
1996 establishments in Portugal
1996 establishments in Spain